Ryan Andrew Broad (born 9 March 1982 in Herston, Queensland) is an Australian professional cricketer who plays for the Queensland Bulls. He is a right-handed opening batsman. Broad was educated at the Anglican Church Grammar School.

Broad is the son of Wayne Broad, who played for Queensland between 1977 and 1983. He was first selected to represent Queensland in November 2005 in a four-day match against Victoria (he scored 23 and 3 in each innings). He took the field for the Australian national team as a substitute fieldsman during the 2006–07 Ashes series, where he caught Andrew Strauss. In November 2011, he reached his highest score in first class cricket, hitting 135 in the second innings of a Sheffield Shield match against Western Australia.

Broad last played for Queensland in the 2011/12 season and he retired from Queensland Premier Cricket, where he had been captaining Wynnum Manly, after the 2015/16 season. He had passed his father to achieve the record amount of runs scored by anyone to bat for Wynnum Manly in his last season.

References

External links
 Cricinfo profile

Queensland cricketers
Australian cricketers
Living people
1982 births
Cricketers from Brisbane
People educated at Anglican Church Grammar School